Selwyn Bougard, now known as El-Divine Amir Bey (born May 23, 1974), better known by his stage name 4th Disciple, is a record producer and audio engineer who was one of the founding members of Killarmy and one of the best-known Wu-Tang-affiliated producers. He is the only member of the Wu Elements to have worked on Wu-Tang Clan's first breakthrough album, as a mixer.

Biography
After being a turntablist on the Wu-Tang Clan's debut album, Enter the Wu-Tang (36 Chambers), 4th Disciple co-produced and helped mix several tracks with the RZA on the first three Wu-Tang solo ventures by various artists, including co-production for "Sub Crazy" by Method Man, "Damage" by Ol' Dirty Bastard as well as mixing credits for some of Raekwon's Only Built 4 Cuban Linx..., on the tracks "Criminology," "Guillotine (Swordz)," "Spot Rusherz," and "Wu-Gambinos." 4th Disciple then produced what was at the time only the second Wu-Tang track ever to lack a RZA production credit, when the Killah Priest solo track "B.I.B.L.E. (Basic Instructions Before Leaving Earth)" was included on GZA's Liquid Swords. This led to five 4th Disciple productions appearing on the double album Wu-Tang Forever.

After producing 15 of the 17 tracks on Killarmy's debut album, Silent Weapons for Quiet Wars, and contributing significant production to the debut albums of Killah Priest (Heavy Mental) and Sunz of Man (The Last Shall be First), 4th Disciple's beats continued to appear in the solo work of the Clan members, including Inspectah Deck and Method Man. However, more recently, 4th Disciple has been concentrating his production on Killarmy, Sunz of Man, and their immediate affiliates rather than the Clan itself. RZA did, in fact, produce the tracks "Wake Up" and "War Face" from Silent Weapons for Quiet Wars

Discography

Videography

References

External links

 Official 4th Disciple Web Site
 Producerville interviews 4th Disciple 10/12/2007

American hip hop record producers
People from Steubenville, Ohio
Wu-Tang Clan affiliates
1974 births
Living people
Killarmy members